First Quantum Minerals is a Canadian-based mining and metals company whose principal activities include mineral exploration, development and mining. Its main product is copper, which accounts for 80% of revenues as of 2016.

First Quantum's common shares are listed for trading on the Toronto Stock Exchange in Canada (symbol "FM"). Until 2016, First Quantum also maintained a secondary listing on the London Stock Exchange (symbol "FQM"), in the United Kingdom.

History
First Quantum was founded in 1983 under the name Xenium Resources.  It changed its name to Zeal Capital in 1989, First Quantum Ventures in 1993, and First Quantum Minerals in 1996.  Its first significant operation was the Bwana Mkubwa mine in Zambia, acquired in 1996. In 2000, First Quantum acquired a partial interest in Mopani Copper Mines, a Zambian copper company. In 2001, it opened the Lonshi Copper Mine in the Democratic Republic of the Congo. Also in 2001, the company acquired the Kansanshi mine in Zambia.

In 2008, First Quantum acquired Toronto-based Scandinavian Minerals Ltd developing the Kevitsa mine in Lapland, northern Finland. In December 2009, First Quantum acquired the Ravensthorpe Nickel Mine in Western Australia for US $340 million from BHP Billiton. In October 2010, First Quantum announced plans to acquire Antares Minerals for $450 million. In November 2010, First Quantum sold its stake in Equinox Minerals. In April 2013, First Quantum successfully completed a hostile takeover of Inmet Mining for CAD$5.1 billion. In June 2013, it was announced that FQM would have to lay off 500 workers at the Sentinel mine in Zambia as it could not sustain their upkeep while waiting for the lifting of a protection order on its operations from the Zambia Environmental Management Agency.

In 2016, it sold the Kevista mine to Boliden AB for US$712 million. In March 2017 First Quantum announced it had launched a $1.6 billion offering of Senior Notes due 2023 and 2025.  In December 2017, First Quantum was announced as "the major mining company that will complete the Pebble Limited Partnership" by Ron Thiessen, president and CEO of Northern Dynasty Minerals Ltd., which is currently the sole owner of the Pebble Partnership.

In 2016, First Quantum was ranked as being among the 13th best of 92 oil, gas, and mining companies on indigenous rights in the Arctic.

In December 2019, Chinese state company Jiangxi Copper agreed to buy a subsidiary of First Quantum's largest shareholder, Pangaea Investment Management Ltd, which holds 17.6 percent of First Quantum, causing shares to spike up to five percent.

In January 2022, negotiations between the Government of Panama and FQM started to define a new contract concerning the Cobre Panama mine. First Quantums subsidiary Minera Panamá S. A. made proposals favorable to the Government of Panamá including yearly payments of US$375 million in tax and royalty revenue. These payments were offered under the condition that metal prices and profitability of this mine would not drop significantly. However, the Government of Panamá halted discussions in December 2022 and announced plans to order the suspension of operations at this mine.

Democratic Republic of the Congo
The Kolwezi tailings project was a major project to extract copper and cobalt from the tailings of older mining operations around Kolwezi. It was expected to produce around 70,000 tonnes per year of copper metal and up to 14,000 tonnes per year of cobalt hydroxide.
In August 2009, the DRC government revoked First Quantum's license due to a dispute over renegotiating the contract. First Quantum ceased operations in September 2009, throwing about 700 people out of work. First Quantum had spent $750 million on acquiring and developing the property. First Quantum took out an action against the DRC government in the International Chamber of Commerce International Court of Arbitration.

The Frontier Mine is an open pit copper mine located near Sakania. 
First Quantum obtained exploration licenses in January 2001 and July 2002. Production began in 2007, and in 2010 the mine yielded 322,700 tonnes of copper. The mine was closed after the governor of Katanga Province, Moses Katumbi, banned the export of ore to Zambia, insisting that it should be refined in Katanga. In May 2010, a Congolese court ruled that FQM's Lonshi and Frontier copper mines had been awarded illegally and that they should revert to state-owned Sodimico. According to FQM, the ruling was due to FQM's decision to contest the expropriation of its Kolwezi tailings project, which was later sold to the Kazakh mining company Eurasian Natural Resources Corporation.

Operations
First Quantum currently operates mines and development projects in Africa, Australia, Finland, Spain, Turkey and Latin America.  In 2016 First Quantum produced 539,458 tonnes of copper, 23,624 tonnes contained tonnes of nickel, 214,012 ounces of gold and 28,862 tonnes of zinc.  Copper was responsible for 80% of revenues, gold 10%, and nickel 7%. As of December 2019, First Quantum operates seven mines.

Operating Mines
Kansanshi mine, near Solwezi in Zambia. Main product copper, by-product gold. Open-pit mine, opened in 2005
Guelb Mohgrein Mine, near Akjoujt, Mauritania. Main product copper, by-product gold. Open pit mine, opened 2006
Sentinel Mine, a copper mine in north-west Zambia opened to commercial production in 2016
Çayeli mine, a copper/zinc mine in eastern Turkey. This mine was acquired through the take-over of Inmet Mining Corporation, and started production in 1994
Las Cruces mine, a copper mine in Sevilla Province, Spain, acquired through the take-over of Inmet Mining Corporation
Pyhäsalmi mine, a copper/zinc mine in central Finland, acquired through the take-over of Inmet Mining Corporation
 Cobre mine, Panama, a copper mine in Panama acquired through Inmet Mining Corporation, which started commercial production in 2019.
Ravensthorpe Nickel Mine, a nickel mine in Western Australia, opened in December 2011, mothballed in 2017. Brought into production again in 2020.

Other Investments/Projects
 Partial interest in Mopani Copper Mines, Zambia
 Fishtie copper project in Central Province, Zambia.  At the end of September 2012, First Quantum Minerals announced that it had entered into a joint venture with a Zambian-based mining company called Mimosa Resources. The purpose of the venture is to develop the Fishtie copper project in the Mkushi District near the border with the Democratic Republic of Congo.
 Taca Taca, a copper project in the Puna de Atacama region in Salta Province, Argentina, acquired through the purchase of Lumina Copper in 2014
 Haquira mine, a copper deposit in the Apurímac Region in southern Peru acquired through the purchase of Antares Minerals in 2010
 Pebble Mine, in Lake and Peninsula Borough near Bristol Bay in southwest Alaska, United States, the most significant undeveloped copper and gold resource in the world. Pending an option agreement to purchase 50% interest in the PLP

Former/Mothballed Mines
Bwana Mkubwa in Copperbelt Province, Zambia, a copper SX/EW plant and mine.  This mine was closed in 2010.
Kevitsa mine, Sodankylä, Finland. Main products are nickel and copper, by product PGE elements. Open pit mine opened in August 2012, and sold in June 2016 to Boliden AB.
Troilus Gold-Copper Mine, closed in 2008 by Inmet, located in northern Quebec, Canada
Winston Lake zinc-copper mine, near Winston Lake, Thunder Bay District, Ontario, Canada. This mine was closed in 1998 by Inmet.
Sturgeon Lake copper-zinc mine, closed, located near Sturgeon Lake, Kenora District, northwestern Ontario.

Carbon footprint
First Quantum Minerals reported Total CO2e emissions (Direct + Indirect) for 31 December 2019 at 3,539 Kt (+1,706/+93% year-over-year).

References

External links
 First Quantum Minerals - official site
 SEDAR profile

Companies based in Toronto
Copper mining companies of Canada
Dual-listed companies
Gold mining companies of Canada
Non-renewable resource companies established in 1996
Canadian companies established in 1996
Copper mining companies of the Democratic Republic of the Congo
Companies formerly listed on the London Stock Exchange
Companies listed on the Toronto Stock Exchange
S&P/TSX 60